Ermenegilde Simete is a Wallisian politician and former member of the Territorial Assembly of Wallis and Futuna. He served as President of the Territorial Assembly from November 2005 to April 2007.

Simete is from Utufua. He was elected President of the Territorial Assembly in November 2005. He was replaced as president by Pesamino Taputai following the 2007 Wallis and Futuna Territorial Assembly election, but was elected president of the Assembly's permanent commission.  He stood for the French National Assembly in the 2007 French legislative election, but was eliminated in the first round.

After leaving politics he worked as a deputy prosecutor in Nouméa, before becoming head of Wallis and Futuna's Director of Catholic Education.

References

Living people
Wallis and Futuna politicians
Presidents of the Territorial Assembly of Wallis and Futuna
Year of birth missing (living people)